Østhorn (until 1939 Korsvoll) is a station on the Sognsvann Line (line 5) of the Oslo Metro in Norway. As one of the original stations on the line, Østhorn was opened on 10 October 1934. Nordberg was formerly the next northbound station, but it was closed in 1992, when the Sognsvann Line was upgraded to metro standard (power supply via third rail). Østhorn is located near a hill named Havnabakken, where local residents toboggan during winter time.

History
Korsvoll station opened on 10 October 1934, when Akersbanerne had finished the Songsvann Line from Majorstuen to Sognsvann station. The line was double-tracked from Majorstuen to Korsvoll, and single-tracked from there to Sognsvann. In 1939, the section Korsvoll–Sognsvann was upgraded to double tracks, and the station Korsvoll had its name changed to Østhorn. The name "Østhorn" (lit. 'East Horn') owes its origins to a crag by the same name that was demolished during the construction of the Sognsvann Line. The station is now positioned inside the remains of the crag, with a metal nest put up to prevent any crumbling of the surrounding crag.

Østhorn was part of Holmenkolbanen's operating network until 1975, when the municipality of Oslo bought all the company's stock. In 1993, the stations on the Sognsvann Line were upgraded to metro standard, which involved a heightening and lengthening of the platforms, and installation of third rail power supply and a new signaling system. During the upgrade, Tåsen station was moved  further north, and Nordberg station was closed. Many local residents opposed the new station upgrades, arguing that Nordberg had served the area well with its close connection to the elderly center Nordberghjemmet. Many wanted to rather close Østhorn or Holstein than Nordberg, since the latter was the most used station in the area. Oslo Sporveier stated that the access roads to Nordberg were very steep and dangerous, and referred to an incident in the 1950s where some local youth had been tobogganing over the rail intersection at Nordberg, and hit a truck near the station. They also argued that the  distance between Nordberg and Holstein was too short for having two separate stations, and promised to build a walkway from Nordberg to Holstein.

Service
Østhorn is served by the line 5 on the Sognsvann Line, operated by Oslo T-banedrift on contract with Ruter. The rapid transit serves the station every 15 minutes, except in the late evening and on weekend mornings, when there is a 30-minute headway. Travel time along the  portion to Stortinget in the city center is 13 minutes.

The station provides correspondence to the bus lines 22 and 25 on the top of Havnabakken, a five-minute walk away.

Facilities
Østhorn has two platforms, with a wooden shed on the southbound platform. The sheds are designed by Arne Henriksen in a minimalist and standardised style with constructions of wood and steel. Østhorn serves the residential areas Korsvoll and Nordberg. The station is located at the bottom of a small hill named Havnabakken, where local residents toboggan at winter's time.

References
Notes

Bibliography

External links

Metro stations in the west
Entry at Norwegian Railway Club

Oslo Metro stations in Oslo
Railway stations opened in 1934
1934 establishments in Norway